Moffat "Mo" Oduor,  Moffat Ongwena (born January 25, 1978, in Eldoret) is a former Kenyan soccer player who previously played for Harrisburg City Islanders in the USL Second Division. Now Mo works as a coach for youth soccer. He coaches SCPASA a youth club in South-Central Pennsylvania.

Career

College
Oduor came to the United States from his native Kenya in 1998 to attend and play college soccer at the University of Charleston, where he earned All-American honors as a sophomore, before transferring to Furman University for his junior and senior years, where he was a college teammate of former US national team member Clint Dempsey.

Professional
Odour turned professional in 2002 with Carolina Dynamo of the USL.  In 2003, he played for the Long Island Rough Riders., before transferring to the Harrisburg City Islanders in 2004.

Oduor has played over 80 games for the Islanders since then, and was part of the Harrisburg team which won the 2007 USL Second Division championship. He garnered All league selection and was named to the USL team of the decade.

References

External links
Harrisburg City Islanders bio

Kenyan footballers
Penn FC players
USL Second Division players
Long Island Rough Riders players
North Carolina Fusion U23 players
1978 births
Living people
Association football midfielders
People from Uasin Gishu County